Nacereddine Khoualed (born 16 April 1986 in Biskra, Algeria) is an Algerian football defense player who plays for US Biskra in the Algerian Ligue Professionnelle 1.

International career
He has been capped for Algeria at the Under-20, Under-23 and A' level.

Honours

Club
 USM Alger
 Algerian Ligue Professionnelle 1 (2): 2013-14, 2015-16
 Algerian Cup (1): 2013
 Algerian Super Cup (2): 2013, 2016
 UAFA Club Cup (1): 2013

References

External links

 DZFoot Profile
 USM-Alger.com Profile

1986 births
Algerian footballers
Living people
USM Alger players
People from Biskra
Algerian expatriate footballers
Algerian expatriate sportspeople in Saudi Arabia
Algerian Ligue Professionnelle 1 players
Algeria A' international footballers
Algeria under-23 international footballers
US Biskra players
2011 African Nations Championship players
Algeria youth international footballers
Association football defenders
Ohod Club players
Expatriate footballers in Saudi Arabia
Saudi Professional League players
Algeria international footballers
21st-century Algerian people